Kuvendi may refer to:
 Assembly of the Republic of Albania
 Assembly of Kosovo
 Güvəndik, Azerbaijan